Hook Common is a hamlet in the civil parish of Hook in the Hart district of Hampshire, England.

Hamlets in Hampshire